Clinton Depot is a historic train station located at Clinton, Sampson County, North Carolina.  It was built between 1915 and 1926, and consists of the passenger depot, the enclosed freight station, and the open platform. The building measures 327 feet long, with the passenger section measuring 42 feet. It is a one-story, brick building with a hipped roof and wide eaves supported by large brackets.

It was added to the National Register of Historic Places in 1986.  It is located in the Clinton Commercial Historic District.

References

Railway stations on the National Register of Historic Places in North Carolina
Railway stations in the United States opened in 1926
Buildings and structures in Sampson County, North Carolina
National Register of Historic Places in Sampson County, North Carolina
Atlantic Coast Line Railroad stations
Individually listed contributing properties to historic districts on the National Register in North Carolina
1926 establishments in North Carolina
Former railway stations in North Carolina